Martin Ehrenreich (born May 10, 1983) is an Austrian footballer, who plays as a centre back for USV Hof and is also the team manager of SK Sturm Graz.

Career

Club career
Ehrenreich started his career at DSV Leoben, for which he played until the winter break of 2002/2003. In January 2003 he moved to FC St. Veit. After the end of the season he moved on to SV Bad Aussee, for which he completed one season. In 2004/05 he moved to FC Lustenau 07 and also played one season there. Then he came back to Styria for FC Gratkorn.

At the end of the 2008/09 season he moved to the two-time Austrian champions SK Sturm Graz. Ehrenreich made his Austrian Bundesliga debut on August 30, 2009 in a 2-1 away win over SV Ried, which suffered a defeat for the first time after more than 20 unbeaten home games in a row. In the game he was substituted on in the 81st minute for Andreas Hölzl and five minutes later gave the also substitute Haris Bukva the winning ball for the 2-1 goal. Ehrenreich scored his first two goals in the Bundesliga on November 27, 2011 when he played against Admira Wacker. After his substitution at break, he scored two goals within eleven minutes.

Later career
In the summer of 2016, he finished his professional career, in order to switch to the management of SK Sturm and continue to play for the club's reserve team. Since then he became involved in marketing and sponsoring at the club, as a part of the club's marketing staff.

In the summer 2019, Ehrenreich was appointed assistant coach of the club's reserve team, which he also still was active for as a player. A year later, in the summer 2020, Ehrenreich moved to USV Hof and was, at the same time, also hired in a new role at Sturm as team manager for the club's team in the Austrian Bundesliga.

References

1983 births
Living people
DSV Leoben players
FC St. Veit players
SV Bad Aussee players
FC Lustenau players
FC Gratkorn players
SK Sturm Graz players
Austrian footballers
Association football defenders